The Kink is a 1927  mystery detective novel by the Irish-born writer Lynn Brock. It was the third novel in his series featuring the character of Colonel Wyckham Gore, one of many investigators active during the Golden Age of Detective Fiction. It is sometimes referred to as Colonel Gore’s Third Case. The novel is noted for being comparatively sexually explicit for the era. Dashiell Hammett wrote a contemporary negative review of the book in The Saturday Review.

Synopsis
Gore is engaged to recover some missing documents, and his search takes him to the country estate of the politician Lord Haviland in Surrey. Here he encounters the debauched lifestyle of Haviland and his family, said to be the result of a kink in the family's bloodline. The resolute Gore ploughs on with his case against a backdrop of pornographic films and orgies.

References

Bibliography
 Keating, Henry Reymond Fitzwalter. Whodunit?: A Guide to Crime, Suspense, and Spy Fiction. Van Nostrand Reinhold Company, 1982.
 Reilly, John M. Twentieth Century Crime & Mystery Writers. Springer, 2015.

External links
 Full text of The Kink at HathiTrust Digital Library

1927 British novels
British mystery novels
British thriller novels
Novels by Lynn Brock
Novels set in Surrey
Novels set in London
British detective novels
William Collins, Sons books